Isola is the surname of the following people
Akinwunmi Isola, Nigerian playwright, actor, dramatist, culture activist and scholar
Albert Isola, Gibraltarian politician
Amédée Isola (1898–1991), French runner
Andrés Isola (born 1974), Olympic windsurfer from Uruguay
Antonia Isola (1876–?), pseudonym of American writer Mabel Earl McGinnis
Émile Isola (1860–1945), French conjurer and theatre director 
Floris Isola (born 1991), French association football player
Frank Isola (1925–2004), American jazz drummer
Frank Isola (sportswriter), American sportswriter
Johnny Dell Isola (1912–1986), American football player
Maija Isola (1927–2001), Finnish textile designer
Peter Isola (1929—2006), Gibraltarian politician and lawyer, father of Albert
Paul Isola, Gibraltarian musician and songwriter
Vincent Isola (1862–1947), French conjurer and theatre director, brother of Émile